Chen Shu (born 3 September 1977) is a Chinese singer and actress.

Early life and education 
Chen was born Chen Shu in Huangshi, Hubei, in a musical family, the daughter of Chen Zongshan, a dancer in Huangshi. Her maternal grandparents were professors at Hubei University.

Chen studied at Medium Dance School affiliated to Beijing Dance Academy and worked as an actress in China Song and Dance Ensemble from 1992 to 1999. Chen graduated from Central Academy of Drama in 2001, where she majored in acting.

Career
After graduation, Chen joined the National Theatre Company of China.

Chen made her acting debut in Urban Sky (2000), playing Mao Xiaoqi. Chen's first film role was uncredited appearance in the film Vast Sky (2002).

In 2008, Chen starred as Bai Liusu in the romantic comedy television series Love in a Fallen City, adapted from Eileen Chang's novel of the same title. That same year, she had a cameo appearance in The Founding of a Republic, a historical film.

Chen won the Golden Eagle Award for Best Actress for her performance in Iron Pear (2010).

In 2012, Chen starred as Amy in the suspense film The Second Woman.

Personal life
On 16 September 2011, Chen married Chinese-Australian musician Zhao Yinyin, a graduate of the Sydney Conservatorium of Music and The Juilliard School.

Filmography

Film

Television series

Theater

Awards and nominations

References

External links

1977 births
People from Huangshi
Living people
Actresses from Hubei
Central Academy of Drama alumni
21st-century Chinese actresses
Chinese stage actresses
Chinese film actresses
Chinese television actresses